This is a list of all captains of the Fremantle Football Club, an Australian rules football club in the Australian Football League and AFL Women's.

AFL

AFL Women's

References

Fremantle Football Club Honour Roll

captains
Fremantle

Fremantle-related lists